Tiffanie DeBartolo (born November 27, 1970) is an American novelist, filmmaker, co-founder of the independent record label Bright Antenna, and co-founder of The ShineMaker Foundation. Tiffanie has written three novels: God-Shaped Hole, How To Kill a Rock Star, and Sorrow. She wrote and directed the film Dream for an Insomniac, featuring Ione Skye and Jennifer Aniston, released in 1996. She also penned the text to the graphic novel GRACE: The Jeff Buckley Story, which was released in April 2019.

Biography
DeBartolo is the daughter of former San Francisco 49ers owner Edward J. DeBartolo, Jr. She attended the all-girls Villa Maria High School and dropped out her senior year when they wouldn't let her graduate early. She later obtained her GED and graduated from UC Berkeley with a philosophy degree, then moved to Los Angeles. She has previously lived in New York City and Boulder, Colorado, and now resides in the San Francisco Bay Area. Her novel writing career began after her screenwriting/directorial debut, with God-Shaped Hole (2002) and How to Kill a Rock Star (2005), both from Sourcebooks Landmark. Sidney Sheldon has praised her sophomore novel, saying it has "Wonderful characters wrapped up in a story that moves like an express train". God-Shaped Hole was published in the UK as The Shape of My Heart. In 2020 she released Sorrow published by Woodhall Press. Sorrow was inspired by the song of the same name by The National from their 2010 album High Violet. She also wrote the text for Grace: Based on the Jeff Buckley Story, a graphic novel about American musician Jeff Buckley (2019).

Bright Antenna
She is one of the owners of the Indie music record label Bright Antenna, which has released music by Sports Team, Middle Class Rut, PREP, The Wombats, Fana Hues, Roman Lewis, Wilderado, Orchestral Manoeuvres in the Dark, Flagship, In The Valley Below, Beware of Darkness, Jimmy Gnecco of OURS, and Cheerleader.

ShineMaker Foundation
She is the co-founder of the ShineMaker Foundation which she started along with her husband Scott Schumaker.

Publications
 DeBartolo, Tiffanie. Sorrow. Woodhall Press LLP, 2020.
DeBartolo, Tiffanie. Grace: Based on the Jeff Buckley Story. First Second, 2019.
 DeBartolo, Tiffanie. How to Kill a Rockstar. Sourcebooks Landmark, 2005.
DeBartolo, Tiffanie. God Shaped Hole. Sourcebooks Landmark, 2002

References

External links

1970 births
Living people
American women screenwriters
Screenwriters from California
American women novelists
University of California, Berkeley alumni
Writers from Youngstown, Ohio
People from Mill Valley, California
Writers from the San Francisco Bay Area
21st-century American novelists
Record producers from California
American filmmakers
21st-century American women writers
DeBartolo family
Novelists from California
Novelists from Ohio
Screenwriters from Ohio
American women record producers